The UnXplained is a television series on History that claims to "explore subjects that have mystified mankind for centuries". The show is hosted and executive produced by William Shatner. It premiered on July 19, 2019, and has aired for four seasons on the History network. The show has not yet been renewed for a fifth season.

Background
On March 27, 2019, History greenlit The UnXplained hosted and executive produced by William Shatner and ordered an initial six episodes. The show is produced by Prometheus Entertainment. Ken Burns and Susan Leventhal also executive produced the first season. History later increased the episode order to an eight episode first season. It premiered July 19, 2019. After the first season History ordered another 20 episodes. The show interviews scientists, historians, engineers, witnesses, and researchers about various "mysterious" topics.

Season one appeared on Netflix in June 2022. Netflix is rumored to be considering ordering season five of The UnXplained.

Episodes
Sources for the episode lists below can be found here.

Season 1 (2019–20)

Season 2 (2020–21)

Season 3 (2021–22)

Season 4 (2022)

Critical reception
Writing in Irish Film Critic, Thomas Tunstall reported that the show's "subject matter runs all over the board, as if designed for an audience with attention deficit disorder. Though Shatner enthusiastically poses many questions, he provides far fewer satisfactory answers – perhaps by design in order to retain the sense of mystery."

Professor Sarah Parcak criticized the show's presentation of archaeology, writing "as it turns out, 'A great archaeological mystery' is a code phrase for 'We are too lazy to read or even Google and honestly, racism is far easier than admitting non white people were/are brilliant innovators.'"

Effects on real world 
The season one episode Evil Places included a segment on Lake Shawnee Amusement Park. After the episode's release on Netflix, the amusement park saw a substantial increase in visitors and tourists.

References

External links
 
 
 The UnXplained on Rotten Tomatoes

William Shatner
History (American TV channel) original programming
Earth mysteries
Unexplained phenomena
Mythological monsters
Paranormal
2019 American television series debuts